Alexander Hugh Norton (born 27 January 1950) is a Scottish actor. He is known for his roles as DCI Matt Burke in the STV detective drama series Taggart, Eric Baird in BBC Two sitcom Two Doors Down, DCS Wallace in Extremely Dangerous, Gerard Findlay in Waterloo Road and Eddie in the Renford Rejects. He has also had roles in internationally successful films including Braveheart, Local Hero and Les Misérables.

Early life
Norton was born in Househillwood, Glasgow and spent part of his childhood in Moffat Street in the Gorbals before moving to Pollokshaws. He was educated at Shawlands Academy, Glasgow. He discovered acting at the age of fourteen via an out-of-school drama group. This led to his part in the TV series Dr. Finlay's Casebook and with it the decision that acting was the career for him. Because of his background and his father's lack of approval of his chosen career, Norton decided to avoid the traditional route into acting and instead worked from part-to-part.

Career
In 1973, he became one of the founder members of the 7:84 company, touring Scotland with The Cheviot, the Stag, and the Black Black Oil.

He has appeared in numerous films including Bill Forsyth's Gregory's Girl (1981), Local Hero (1983) and Comfort and Joy (1984), A Sense of Freedom (1981), Comrades (1986), Hidden City (1987), Scandal (1989), Countdown to War (1989), Robin Hood (1991), Chernobyl: The Final Warning (1991), Blame It on the Bellboy (1992), Squanto: A Warrior's Tale (1994), Little Voice (1998), Orphans (1998) and Beautiful Creatures (2000), as well as Hollywood blockbusters such as White Hunter, Black Heart (1990) with Clint Eastwood, Patriot Games (1992) with Harrison Ford, Braveheart (1995) starring Mel Gibson and Pirates of the Caribbean: Dead Man's Chest (2006) with Johnny Depp. Norton also voiced Thurston McCondry in the animated shorts Haunted Hogmanay and Glendogie Bogey.

In addition to his role as DCI Matt Burke in Taggart, he had previously appeared in the same series as murder suspect George Bryce in the episode "Knife Edge" in 1986.

He was the subject of This Is Your Life in 2003 when he was surprised by Michael Aspel. In 2005, Norton was presented with the opportunity to play a part in Peter Jackson's King Kong; however, he could not accept the offer because it happened to interfere with the TV project he was working on at the time.

From August to September 2012, he played the role of Gerard Findlay in Waterloo Road, a hot-headed, villainous headteacher from rival school Havelock High School.

In March 2014, he played Cameron Watts in the "Dead Water" episodes of the BBC One crime drama series Shetland.

In 2014, Norton appeared in the documentary I Belong To Glasgow, a BBC Scotland production in which he guest starred alongside Karen Dunbar.

Since 2013, Norton has played Eric in the sitcom Two Doors Down.

Personal life 
In the 1970s he met his wife, Sally Kinghorn. They met on the set of a BBC Schools series. The couple have three sons, Jamie, Rory and Jock.

In 2014, at the time of the Scottish independence referendum, Norton endorsed a "No" vote in opposition to independence. He has, however, confirmed his support for Scottish independence since the referendum.

Awards and other work
Norton has also won two awards for writing. "Extras", an episode of First Sight for Channel 4 and Waiting for Elvis for STV. He also has an interest in directing. He directed the first production of Tony Roper's The Steamie, as well as directing Glasgow's King's Theatre's pantomimes for a five-year period.

He appeared in The Black Adder in the episode "Born to be King" as Dougal McAngus, 4th Duke of Argyll.

He has also done voice over work on Medieval Total War II as the voice of some of the Scottish characters in the game, along with voicing  in Hearts of Stone, an expansion pack for the video game The Witcher 3: Wild Hunt and King Rab in Dragon Quest XI . He provided additional vocals on "The Song of Mor'du" in Brave, which also featured his wife Sally Kinghorn. He also appeared on The Weakest Link TV Drama Characters Edition. He was the first one voted off.

Norton also fronts the STV crime show Unsolved. Norton also plays Grandad in the CBeebies programme Woolly and Tig.

Filmography
The Hunch (1967) .... Ian
A Sense of Freedom (1979) .... Malkie
Gregory's Girl (1981) .... Alec
Local Hero (1983) .... Watt
The Black Adder (1983) .... McAngus, Duke of Argyll
Every Picture Tells a Story (1983) .... William Scott Sr.
Comfort and Joy (1984) .... Trevor
Comrades (1986) .... Diorama Showman / Lanternist / Laughing Cavalier / Sgt. Bell / Mr Wetham (scene cut) / Usher / Wollaston / Ranger / Tramp / Captain / McCallum / Silhouettist / Mad Photographer / Witch
Hidden City (1987) .... Hillcombe
Rab C Nesbitt (1988) Seasonal Greet .... DodieScandal (1989) .... Detective InspectorBearskin: An Urban Fairytale (1989) .... HaroldCountdown to War (1989, TV Movie) .... StalinWhite Hunter Black Heart (1990) .... ZibelinskyChernobyl: The Final Warning (1991, TV Movie) .... Dr. AndreyevRobin Hood (1991) .... HarryUnder Suspicion (1991) .... Prosecuting LawyerBlame It on the Bellboy (1992) .... AlfioPatriot Games (1992) .... Dennis CooleySquanto: A Warrior's Tale (1994) .... HardingBraveheart (1995) .... Bride's FatherLes Misérables (1998) .... GeneralOrphans (1998) .... HansonLittle Voice (1998) .... Bunnie MorrisComplicity (2000) .... Kenny GarnetBeautiful Creatures (2000) .... Det Insp HepburnThe Count of Monte Cristo (2002) .... NapoleonPirates of the Caribbean: Dead Man's Chest (2006) .... Captain Bellamy (Edinburgh)Sir Billi (2012) .... Butler / Baron McToff (voice)Underdogs'' (2013) .... Gregor (English version, voice)

References

External links
 

1950 births
Living people
20th-century Scottish male actors
21st-century Scottish male actors
Male actors from Glasgow
People from Gorbals
Scottish male television actors
Scottish male film actors
People educated at Shawlands Academy